John Walls Cushnahan (born 23 July 1948) is a former politician in both Northern Ireland and the Republic of Ireland who served as leader of the Alliance Party of Northern Ireland and then as a Member of the European Parliament for Fine Gael.

Cushnahan was educated at St Mary's Christian Brothers Grammar School and Queen's University, Belfast and worked as a teacher before going into politics. He worked as General Secretary of the Alliance Party from 1974 until 1982 and was a member of Belfast City Council between 1977 and 1985.

In 1982 he was elected to the Prior Assembly for North Down and two years later he became the new leader of Alliance, succeeding Oliver Napier. During his tenure as leader he sought to strengthen the party's links with the British Liberal Party. The Anglo Irish Agreement was signed during this period and Cushnahan faced the difficult position of giving Alliance support to it and facing the united opposition of the Unionist parties. However, when the Assembly was dissolved in 1986, Cushnahan found it financially difficult to remain in politics and so stood down as leader in 1987 to be succeeded by John Alderdice.

Two years later Cushnahan made a surprise political comeback when he moved to the Republic of Ireland and stood as a Fine Gael candidate in the 1989 election to the European Parliament, winning a seat in the Munster constituency. He was an MEP for fifteen years before retiring at the 2004 elections.

Cushnahan now serves as a board member of the peace and reconciliation charity Co-operation Ireland.

References

External links

1948 births
Living people
Leaders of the Alliance Party of Northern Ireland
Members of Belfast City Council
Northern Ireland MPAs 1982–1986
Schoolteachers from Northern Ireland
People educated at St. Mary's Christian Brothers' Grammar School, Belfast
Alumni of Queen's University Belfast
MEPs for the Republic of Ireland 1999–2004
MEPs for the Republic of Ireland 1994–1999
MEPs for the Republic of Ireland 1989–1994
Fine Gael MEPs
Alliance Party of Northern Ireland councillors